Tan Book may refer to:
 The initial name of the Beige Book, the Summary of Commentary on Current Economic Conditions, a qualitative report on the state of the US economy based on anecdotal observations of the United States Federal Reserve Board, following its renaming from the Red Book in 1983.
 TAN Books, a Catholic American book distributor and publisher out of Charlotte, North Carolina.